Commodore Garrett Jesse Pendergrast (December 5, 1802 – November 7, 1862) was an officer in the United States Navy, who served at the beginning of the American Civil War.

Early life and career
Pendergrast entered the navy as a midshipman on January 1, 1812, was promoted to lieutenant on March 3, 1821, and to commander on September 8, 1841.

On 27 October 1843 he recommissioned the sloop  at Boston, sailing to the South Atlantic to join the Brazil Squadron, where he remained for over two years, finally returning to the New York Navy Yard in February 1846.

Promoted to Captain on May 24, 1855, he commissioned the frigate  on February 20, 1856.

On September 24, 1860, Pendergrast sailed from Philadelphia aboard the sloop  in order to assume command of the Home Squadron, then operating off the coast of Mexico.

Civil War
At the outbreak of war in 1861, then Captain Pendergrast was in command of the frigate  at the Norfolk Navy Yard, having just returned from Vera Cruz, Mexico.

At the age of 58, Pendergrast was one of the oldest officers in service. A native of Kentucky, he was married to Virginia Barron, the daughter of Commodore James Barron. Upon the Secession, she reportedly refused to accompany her husband in his allegiance to the United States and swore she would never live with him again.

The first significant victory for the U.S. Navy during the early phases of the Union blockade occurred on April 24, 1861, when Pendergrast and the Cumberland, accompanied by a small flotilla of support ships, began seizing Confederate ships and privateers in the vicinity of Fort Monroe off the Virginia coastline. Within the next two weeks, Pendergrast had captured 16 enemy vessels, serving early notice to the Confederate War Department that the blockade would be effective if extended.

Promoted to commodore on July 16, 1862, Pendergrast was assigned to command the Philadelphia Navy Yard, and was holding that position when he died of a paralytic stroke on November 7, 1862. He is buried at Laurel Hill Cemetery, Philadelphia.

Family

Dates of rank
Midshipman - 1 January 1812
Lieutenant - 3 March 1821
Commander - 8 September 1841
Captain - 24 May 1855
Commodore, Retired List - 16 July 1862

See also

References
Notes

Bibliography
 The Civil War. The Blockade: Raiders and Runners. Time–Life Books, 1983.

External links
 Photo of Pendergrast

1802 births
1862 deaths
United States Navy officers
People from Kentucky
Union Navy officers
United States Navy personnel of the Mexican–American War
United States Navy personnel of the War of 1812
People of Kentucky in the American Civil War
Burials at Laurel Hill Cemetery (Philadelphia)